The United States Office of Personnel Management (OPM) is an independent agency of the United States Federal Government that manages the US civilian service. The agency provides federal human resources policy, oversight and support, and tends to healthcare (FEHB) and life insurance (FEGLI) and retirement benefits (CSRS/FERS, but not TSP) for federal government employees, retirees and their dependents.

OPM is headed by a director, who is nominated by the President and confirmed by the Senate. On the day of his Inauguration on January 20, 2021, President Joe Biden announced that the chief management officer, Kathleen McGettigan, would be acting director. The current director, Kiran Ahuja, was sworn in on June 24, 2021.

History
The United States Civil Service Commission was created by the Pendleton Civil Service Reform Act of 1883. The commission was renamed as the Merit Systems Protection Board (MSPB), and most of commission's former functions - with the exception of the Federal employees appellate function - were assigned to new agencies, with most being assigned to the newly created U.S. Office of Personnel Management (OPM) on January 1, 1979,  and Reorganization Plan No. 2 of 1978

On 1 January 1979, the Office of Personnel Management was established with the dissolution of the U.S. Civil Service Commission following the passage and signing of the Civil Service Reform Act of 1978 into law by President Jimmy Carter (D). .

The United States Office of Government Ethics, responsible for directing executive branch policies relating to the prevention of conflicts of interest on the part of Federal executive branch officers and employees, was formerly a part of OPM, until being spun off as an independent agency in 1989.

In 1996 the investigation branch of the OPM was privatized, and USIS was formed. In 2014, after several scandals, OPM declined to renew its contract with USIS and brought background investigations back in house under the short-lived National Background Investigations Bureau. In 2019, the responsibility for conducting federal background checks changed hands again when NBIB was dissolved and its functions given to the Defense Security Service, part of the Department of Defense, which was reorganized into the Defense Counterintelligence and Security Agency for the purpose.

2015 data breach 

In June 2015, the Office of Personnel Management announced that it had discovered in April 2015 that it had been hacked more than a year earlier in a data breach, resulting in the theft of approximately 4 million personnel records handled by the office. The Washington Post has reported that the attack originated in China, citing unnamed government officials.  By July 9, 2015, the estimate of stolen records had increased to 21.5 million, including those of current government personnel and people who had undergone background checks.

New updates regarding this security breach came to light on September 24, 2015.  The agency then indicated that additional evidence showed that 5.6 million people's fingerprints were stolen as part of the hacks, more than five times the 1.1 million originally estimated. The total number of individuals whose records were disclosed in whole or part, including Social Security numbers and addresses, remained at 21.5 million.

Attempts at Reform 
In July 2013, Rep. Blake Farenthold (R-Texas) introduced the Office of Personnel Management Inspector General Act. The bill would increase oversight of OPM's revolving fund. Farenthold introduced the bill as a response to accusations of fraud and concerns about security clearance background investigations. The bill would fund the expenses for investigations, oversight activities and audits from the revolving fund. The bill was in response to a find that between 2002 and 2012, OPM's revolving fund had tripled, totaling over $2 billion, or 90% of OPM's budget.  In February 2014, President Obama signed the bill into law.  The fund's history goes back to the early 1980s, where it was used for two main activities: training and background investigations for government personnel.

Between 2018 and 2019, as part of a larger initiative to restructure the executive branch, President Donald Trump (R) submitted a proposal to congress to merge OPM into the General Services Administration (GSA) while returning the federal personnel policy-making components under the direct authority of the Executive office of the President via the White House Office of Management and Budget. House Rep. Gerry Connolly (D-VA), chairman of the Subcommittee on Government Operations under the House Committee on Oversight and Reform, was the fiercest critic of the proposal.  During a congressional hearing, Connolly claimed: "The administration wants to take over the merit policy-making functions and put them into the highly politicized environment of the White House itself, away from direct congressional oversight and inspector general review." Political pressure against the proposal peaked when a provision barring the President from transferring any function, responsibility, authority, service, system or program that is assigned in law until 6 months after the completion of an "independent report" issued by the federally-chartered National Academy of Public Administration was added to the 1,120 page bill S-1790, a.k.a. the National Defense Authorization Act for Fiscal Year 2020.

Function
According to its website, the mission of the OPM is "recruiting, retaining and honoring a world-class force to serve the American people." The OPM is partially responsible for maintaining the appearance of independence and neutrality in the Administrative Law System.  While technically employees of the agencies they work for, Administrative Law Judges (or ALJs) are hired exclusively by the OPM, effectively removing any discretionary employment procedures from the other agencies.  The OPM uses a rigorous selection process which ranks the top three candidates for each ALJ vacancy, and then makes a selection from those candidates, generally giving preference to veterans.

OPM is also responsible for federal employee retirement applications for FERS and CSRS employees. OPM makes decisions on federal employee regular and disability retirement cases.  OPM also oversees FEHB and FEGLI, the health insurance and life insurance programs for Federal employees.  However, it does not oversee TSP, which is handled by the Federal Retirement Thrift Investment Board (FRTIB), a separate independent agency.

Components 
 Retirement Services - Oversees the Civil Service Retirement Service (CSRS) and the Federal Employee Retirement Service (FERS).
 Healthcare & Insurance - Oversees the Federal Employee Health Benefits (FEHB) and Federal Employee Group Life Insurance (FEGLI) programs.
 Employee Services Branch
 Human Resources Branch

Directors of OPM
Source: OPM's  Agency Leadership Through Time

 Alan K. Campbell (January 2, 1979 – January 20, 1981) 
Campbell was the Chairman of the Civil Service Commission at its dissolution
 Donald J. Devine (March 23, 1981 – March 25, 1985)
 Loretta Cornelius (acting; 1985)
 Constance Horner (August 22, 1985 – May 10, 1989) 
 Constance Berry Newman (June 8, 1989 – June 30, 1992)
 James B. King (April 7, 1993 – September 1, 1997)
 Janice R. Lachance (November 12, 1997 – January 20, 2001)
 Steven R. Cohen (acting; January 20, 2001 – July 11, 2001)
 Kay Coles James (July 11, 2001 – January 31, 2005)
 Dan Gregory Blair (acting; February 1, 2005 – June 27, 2005)
 Linda M. Springer (June 28, 2005 – August 13, 2008)
Michael Hager (acting; August 13, 2008 – January 20, 2009)
Kathie Ann Whipple (acting; January 20, 2009 - April 13, 2009)
John Berry (April 13, 2009 – April 13, 2013) 
Elaine Kaplan (acting; April 13, 2013 – October 31, 2013)
Katherine Archuleta (November 4, 2013 – July 10, 2015)
Beth Cobert (acting; July 10, 2015 to January 19, 2017)
Kathleen McGettigan (acting; January 19, 2017 – March 9, 2018)
Jeff Tien Han Pon (March 9, 2018 – October 5, 2018)
Margaret Weichert (acting; October 5, 2018 – September 16, 2019)
Dale Cabaniss (September 16, 2019 – March 17, 2020)
Michael Rigas (acting; March 18, 2020 – January 20, 2021)
Kathleen McGettigan (acting; January 20, 2021 – June 24, 2021)
Kiran Ahuja (June 24, 2021 – Present)

See also

Civil service
Combined Federal Campaign
Federal Labor Relations Authority
Hatch Act
Human Resources University
Presidential Management Fellows Program
SHPS
Title 5 of the Code of Federal Regulations
United States Merit Systems Protection Board

References

External links
 Office of Personnel Management
 Office of Personnel Management on USAspending.gov
 Office of Personnel Management in the Federal Register

 
Personnel Management
Civil service in the United States
Government agencies established in 1979
Human resource management
National civil service commissions
1979 establishments in Washington, D.C.